The Maria Dimension  is a 1991 album by The Legendary Pink Dots.

Overview

The original edition was released by PIAS (Play It Again Sam) in Belgium and Europe. The first 3,000 copies of the European CD edition included a bonus CD3" containing additional tracks. These were later re-released on the 1995 compilation Chemical Playschool 8+9.

Other editions include Caroline and Cacciocavallo/Soleilmoon in the U.S., and SPV in Poland (with different artwork by Zdzisław Beksiński).

Track listing

Cassette and CD versions (the vinyl LP had only tracks 1 to 8):

A bonus 3" CD came with the first 3000 copies of the album. These songs have since been re-released on Chemical Playschool 8+9.

Personnel

 Musical

The Legendary Pink Dots:

 Edward Ka-Spel (as "The Prophet Qa'Sepel") - vocals, performer
 Phil Knight (as "The Silver Man") - performer
 Bob Pistoor (as "Father Pastorius") - performer
 Niels van Hoorn (as "Niels van Hoornblower") - performer

With:

 Hans Meyer - electronic devices
 Jason (Salmon) - additional vocals (on "Pennies for Heaven")
 Marie -

Playing:

 Instruments - keyboards, samples, electric guitar, acoustic guitar, sitar, Hawaiian guitar, lyre, percussion, tea cups, tenor saxophone, baritone saxophone, flute, bass clarinet, glockenspiel, bass guitar, drums, voices "(sometimes from beyond)"

 Technical

 Edward Ka-Spel - master tape

 Graphical

 Stephan Barbery - artwork

References

1991 albums
The Legendary Pink Dots albums
Neo-psychedelia albums